Woodland Park is an unincorporated community and census-designated place in Stanton County, Nebraska, United States. Its population was 1,866 as of the 2010 census. Nebraska Highway 35 passes through the community.

Geography

Demographics

References

Unincorporated communities in Stanton County, Nebraska
Unincorporated communities in Nebraska
Census-designated places in Stanton County, Nebraska
Census-designated places in Nebraska